The 2013 Edmonton municipal election was held Monday, October 21, 2013 to elect a mayor and 12 councillors to the city council, seven of the nine trustees to Edmonton Public Schools, and the seven trustees to the Edmonton Catholic Schools. Two incumbent public school trustees had no challengers. From 1968 to 2013, provincial legislation has required every municipality to hold elections every three years. The Legislative Assembly of Alberta passed a bill on December 5, 2012, amending the Local Authorities Election Act. Starting with the 2013 elections, officials are elected for a four-year term, and municipal elections are moved to a four-year cycle.

The 12 electoral wards are the same as that of the 2010 election; each represented by a single councillor. Of the estimated 619,138 eligible voters, only 213,585 turned in a ballot, a voter turnout of 34.5%. A municipal census conducted in 2012 showed a population of 817,498, meaning approximately 75.7% of the population was eligible to vote. Three incumbent councillors retired from politics, Jane Batty, Kim Krushell, and Linda Sloan, while incumbent councillors Kerry Diotte, Don Iveson and Karen Leibovici ran for the position left by incumbent Mayor Stephen Mandel, guaranteeing at least six new councillors.  The six vacancies were the only new councillors, as the remaining seven incumbents were re-elected. While the mayoral election was billed as a three-way race between the incumbent councillors, on election night Iveson won by a large margin.

Candidates
Bold indicates elected, italics indicates incumbent.

Mayor

Kristine Acielo - sales with ACN Canada
Kerry Diotte - incumbent ward 11 councillor
Don Iveson - incumbent ward 10 councillor
Karen Leibovici - incumbent ward 5 councillor, former MLA
Josh Semotiuk - electrician
Gordon Ward

Ward 1

Sean Amato - television journalist
Andrew Knack - community league president, finished second in the 2010 Ward 1 race
Sharon Maclise
Jamie Post - finished third in the 2010 Ward 1 race
Bryan Sandilands - health economist

Ward 2

Mustafa Ali
Bev Esslinger - former public school chair
Ted Grand - purchaser
Nita Jalkanen
Don Koziak - finished second in the 2010 Ward 2 race
Jason Millar - trucking company manager
Shelley Tupper - finished third in the 2010 Ward 2 race

Ward 3

Rob Bernshaw
David Dodge - CKUA radio producer
Hakin Isse - business owner
Dave Loken - incumbent

Ward 4

Ed Gibbons - incumbent
Sam Hachem - real estate agent

Ward 5

Rudy Arcilla - former Catholic school trustee
Terry Demers - president of community league, finished second in the 2010 Ward 3 race
Jim Gibbon - brewery founder
Mark Grandish - finished fourth in the 2010 Ward 5 race
Rob Hennigar - business owner
Brian Kendrick - finished third in the 2010 Ward 5 race
Michael Oshry - business owner
Allan Santos - transit operator
Alla Ternikova - construction business manager

Ward 6

* indicates withdrew from race after nomination day

Taz Bouchier
Kyle Brown - city employee
Candas Jane Dorsey - writer
Derrick Forsythe - provincial employee
Carla Frost - finished fifth in the 2010 Ward 6 race
Melinda Hollis - psychotherapist
Bryan Kapitza - finished second in the 2010 Ward 6 race
Heather MacKenzie - former public school trustee
Scott McKeen - finished second in the 2010 Ward 7 race, journalist
Erin Northey - swim instructor
Adil Pirbhai - finished seventh in the 1998 Ward 5 race, accountant
Javed Sommers - public service auditor, withdrew from race on October 19 and endorsed Heather MacKenzie
Alfie White - mechanic
Dexx Williams - financial advisor

Ward 7

Tony Caterina - incumbent
Dave Colburn - former public school board chairman
Tish Prouse - archeologist
Terry Rolls - finished fourth in the 2010 Ward 7 race
Mimi Williams - finished third in the 2001 Ward 2 race, activist

Ward 8

Ben Henderson - incumbent

Ward 9

Bryan Anderson - incumbent
Andrew Gorman - Edmonton International Airport employee

Ward 10

Ray Bessel - businessman
Hafis Devji - businessman
Richard Feehan - university instructor
Dan Johnstone (also known as "Can Man Dan") - activist
Michael Walters - community organizer

Ward 11

Rob Aromin - labourer
Sonia Bitar - former citizenship judge
Mujahid Chak - public servant
Dennis Gane - businessman
Roberto Maglalang - finished sixth in the 2010 Ward 11 race, human resources director
Mike Nickel - former councillor
Harvey Panesar - mixed martial arts promoter
Brent Schaffrick - finished third in the 2010 Ward 11 race, drilling consultant

Ward 12

Chinwe Okelu - finished second in the 2010 Ward 11 race
Amarjeet Sohi - incumbent

Public school trustees

Separate school trustees

Mayoral opinion polling

2015 by-election
On May 5, 2015, Sarah Hoffman left her position as Ward G trustee for Edmonton Public Schools, and was elected as an MLA in the Alberta general election for Edmonton-Glenora. The 2015 Edmonton municipal by-election was held on Monday September 28, 2015 to elect one trustee to replace Hoffman.

2016 by-election
In October 2015 Amarjeet Sohi left his position as Ward 12 city councillor, after being elected as an MP in the Canadian federal election for Edmonton Mill Woods. The 2016 Edmonton municipal by-election was held on Monday February 22, 2016 to elect one councillor to replace Sohi. With 32 candidates running, the by-election had a record number of candidates for a by-election in Alberta.

References

External links
 City of Edmonton: Edmonton Elections

2013
2013 Alberta municipal elections